Alex Ross (born September 25, 1992) is a former American professional gridiron football quarterback. He previously played for the BC Lions, Winnipeg Blue Bombers, and San Diego Fleet. He played college football at Coastal Carolina.

College career
Ross played college football for the Coastal Carolina Chanticleers from 2011 to 2015.

Professional career
In April 2016, Ross agreed to attend the training camp of the Atlanta Falcons.

He signed with the BC Lions in January 2017. In April 2018, Ross was released by the Lions and then signed by the Winnipeg Blue Bombers. He was let go in September.

In October 2018, Ross signed with the Memphis Express. However, he was selected by the San Diego Fleet with the last pick of the 2019 AAF QB Draft. During the fourth game of the 2019 AAF season against the Express, Ross replaced an injured Philip Nelson in the second quarter; he completed 8 of 18 passes for 80 yards, a touchdown (to Marcus Baugh) and an interception, and lost two fumbles in the 26–23 loss. The league ceased operations in April 2019.

Statistics

References

External links
 Coastal Carolina bio

1992 births
Living people
American players of Canadian football
American football quarterbacks
BC Lions players
Canadian football quarterbacks
Coastal Carolina Chanticleers football players
People from Alpharetta, Georgia
Players of American football from Georgia (U.S. state)
San Diego Fleet players
Sportspeople from Fulton County, Georgia
Winnipeg Blue Bombers players